"Those Gurlz" is a song by American rapper Snoop Dogg, taken from Snoop Dogg's ninth studio album Ego Trippin'. It is produced by Teddy Riley and DJ Quik,  was released on July 22, 2008, as the fourth single from the album.

Track listing 
CD Single
Those Gurlz (Clean) — 4:00
Those Gurlz (Dirty) — 4:00
Those Gurlz (Instrumental) — 4:00

Awards and nominations

Charts

References

External links
Snoop Dogg on Myspace
Music video for "Those Gurlz"

2008 singles
2008 songs
Snoop Dogg songs
Songs written by Snoop Dogg
Song recordings produced by Teddy Riley
Song recordings produced by DJ Quik
Geffen Records singles